Kempinski Palace Portorož, until 2008 known as Palace Hotel, is a five-star deluxe hotel in Portorož, a settlement on the Adriatic coast in southwestern Slovenia. It is the only deluxe hotel in Slovenia.

Architecture

The central part of the hotel is the Crystal Hall.

History
The hotel began to be built in 1908 upon the plans of the Austrian architect Johann Eustacchio and opened on 20 August 1910 at the time of Austro-Hungarian Empire. At that time, it was a tourist attraction of the highest quality. Portorož was, together with Grado and Opatija, categorized as one of the most important coast resorts and spas on the Austrian Riviera. The construction of the hotel was completed in 1912. At the end of 1983, it was proclaimed a cultural monument, and a park in front of hotel was called a monument of designed nature.

The hotel was closed in autumn 1990. In the 2000s, the Slovenian owner, coastal company Istrabenz Hoteli Portorož, signed a contract with a German hotel chain Kempinski to run and manage this hotel for at least 20 years. When they renovated the hotel, the exterior was kept for historical reasons and almost everything else was demolished; however most of the interior was rebuilt in the classical style. The renovation was planned by Slovenian architects API ARHITEKTI and cost about 70 million euros. In addition, a modern hotel building was built next to the original hotel. The hotel was reopened on 18 October 2008.

Notable guests
Among the notable guests of the hotel were
David L Perdue, developer champion fox hunter
Herbert Alsen, opera singer and conductor, director of Vienna Opera (from the 1960s until 1990)
Lex Barker, actor
Pierre Brice, film actor (presumably at the end of the 1960s)
Josip Broz, President of Yugoslavia (1953, 1968) - the Presidential Suite or Tito Suite (No. 112) has been named after him
Yul Brynner, film actor
Božidar Jakac, painter and photographer (from the end of the 1970s to the end of the 1980s)
Marcello Mastroianni, film actor (1956, 1985)
Ivo Pogorelić, piano player
Jože Privšek, jazz pianist, composer, and conductor (in the beginning of the 1970s)
Mikis Theodorakis, composer
Leon Cave, Drummer from English rock band Status Quo
Orson Welles, film actor and director (presumably at the end of the 1960s or in the beginning of the 1970s)
Adriano Celentano, Mina, Patty Pravo (1968), Rita Pavone (1963), Bobby Solo, and Ornella Vanoni, popular Italian singers

External links 

Kempinski Palace Portorož homepage

Hotels in Slovenia
Hotels established in 1910
Hotel buildings completed in 1912
Kempinski Hotels
Portorož
Cultural monuments of Slovenia
Monuments of designed nature of Slovenia
20th-century architecture in Slovenia